Del Rio ISD v. Salvatierra is a Texas Supreme Court ruling filed in 1930.

Background
The ruling sought to determine whether or not segregated schools for Hispanics were necessary. It ruled calling for the segregation of blacks, whites, and hispanics into three separate school systems. It was later overturned by Delgado v. Bastrop ISD. Cassandra M. Vara credits the ruling with mobilizing the Latino community to fight for their rights.

See also
 Lemon Grove Incident
 Clark v. Board of School Directors
 Mendez v. Westminster
 Maestas vs. George H. Shone

References

20th-century American trials
Education in Texas
Legal history of Texas
1930 in Texas
Civil rights movement case law
1930 in education
School segregation in the United States
United States racial discrimination case law